Louis Eugène Edmond Wilhelme (9 June 1900 – 20 September 1966) was a French track and field athlete who competed in the 1924 Summer Olympics. He finished fifth in the long jump and failed to reach the triple jump final.

References

1900 births
1966 deaths
French male long jumpers
French male triple jumpers
Olympic athletes of France
Athletes (track and field) at the 1924 Summer Olympics
20th-century French people